Tania Chen is a mixed media artist and interdisciplinary pianist who composes experimental, improvised and contemporary music. She plays for a global audience, but is mostly based in New York, San Francisco, and London. She is known for performing the works of composers such as Cornelius Cardew (Recording), Michael Parsons, John Cage, Earle Brown (recording), Morton Feldman and Chris Newman. Composers of the younger generation she has worked with include John Lely, Li-Chuan Chong and James Saunders.

She has also collaborated with musicians including improviser and composer Steve Beresford (with whom she recorded 'Ointment'), composer Andrew Poppy (concert), pianist John Tilbury, bassist John Edwards, drummer Mark Sanders and harpist Rhodri Davies. She has also collaborated with the film-maker Jayne Parker.

She has performed in the US, UK, Asia and Europe, at venues including Tate Modern, GaleGates (Brooklyn, NYC), The Hamburger Bahnhof Museum (Berlin), the Purcell Room, where she gave a complete performance of John Cage's Music of Changes Books I-IV, and the Fukuoka Asian Art Museum.

Recent concerts include Cornelius Cardew for BBC Radio 3 (Concert program and listing) and a performance of Satie's Vexations for the "Sleep" Installation at the Tate Modern 27 & 28 May 2007, alongside Michael Nyman, Gavin Bryars and Joshua Rifkin.

Originally trained as a classical pianist, she studied (amongst others) with Stephen Coombs, Professor at the Guildhall School of Music and Drama, as well as taking masterclasses with Artur Pizarro. Her piano career took a turn towards contemporary music in the late 1990s, when she studied with noted pianist John Tilbury, and became noted for her performances of composers such as  John Cage and Morton Feldman, amongst others.  She was subsequently awarded an M(Mus) at Goldsmiths College, University of London, with distinction. During this time she also took part in a masterclass with Mstislav Rostropovich(link).

Partial discography
Cornelius Cardew - chamber music 1955-1964
Earl Brown Chamber Music
'Ointment', Review

External links
 Personal website
 Review of John Cage performance at Purcell Room, 2002
 Review of performance at Planet Tree festival at Conway Hall, 2001
 Myspace

English contemporary pianists
English women pianists
Living people
Free improvisation
21st-century pianists
21st-century English women musicians
Year of birth missing (living people)
21st-century women pianists